Giovanni Bembo (21 August 1543 – 16 March 1618) was the 92nd Doge of Venice, reigning from his election on 2 December 1615 until his death. His reign is notable for Venetian victories during the War of Gradisca (1617) and for the Bedmar Plot (1618), in which the Spanish ambassador to Venice, Alfonso de la Cueva, 1st Marquis of Bedmar, was unsuccessful in his plans to destabilize the Most Serene Republic.

Background, 1543–1615

Giovanni was born in Venice, the son of Augustine Bembo and Chiara Del Basso. The Bembos were one of the vecchie, old Venetian noble families. Giovanni Bembo's mother left him with a large inheritance, which he divided with one brother.

Bembo enrolled as a crew of a galley at age 12, and he remained aboard ship for sixteen years. He fought in the Battle of Lepanto (1571), showing great courage in spite of being wounded repeatedly.

Following his good showing in the Battle of Lepanto, Bembo was appointed provveditore. He served with distinction and went on to become savio, consigliere, and subsequently Procurator of St Mark's.

Reign as Doge of Venice, 1615–1618

Doge Marcantonio Memmo died on 31 October 1615, leaving no obvious choice for a successor. In the ensuing dogal election the old noble families (the vecchie faction) were divided between two candidates, while the new noble families (the nuove faction) were unable to unite behind a candidate at all. The 41 electors passed through several rounds of voting without reaching a decision, leading to rioting in Venice. Eventually, on 2 December 1615 a compromise was concluded and Bembo, a moderate member of the vecchie faction, was elected as Doge. As always, sumptuous feasts were held to celebrate the occasion.

For a number of years, Venice had been harassed by Uskoci pirates, encouraged by Ferdinand, Archduke of Inner Austria, who offered the Uskoci his protection. Bembo's first act as Doge was therefore to declare war on Austria, launching the War of Gradisca (known in German as the Friulian War). This war saw the destruction of the Uskoci. The war took place in Friuli, Gradisca d'Isonzo, Gorizia, and Istria. Venice had the upper hand militarily, with troops under Francesco Erizzo besieging Gradisca d'Isonzo successfully until the arrival of troops commanded by Albrecht von Wallenstein arrived, at which point Venice sued for peace, and a peace treaty was signed in Paris on 27 September 1617.

1617-18 saw Alfonso de la Cueva, 1st Marquis of Bedmar, the Spanish Ambassador to Venice, attempted to destabilize Venice by sowing discord, which would allow Spanish troops to march into Venice and seize control of the city. Bembo participated in the initial councils called to counter the threat, before dying on 16 March 1618 in Venice.

References

This article is based on this article from Italian Wikipedia.

1543 births
1618 deaths
16th-century Venetian people
17th-century Venetian people
17th-century Doges of Venice
Procurators of Saint Mark
Giovanni